The Krka is a river in southeastern Slovenia (the traditional region of Lower Carniola), a right tributary of the Sava.

Name
The name Krka was first attested in written sources in 799 as Corca (and as Gurke in 1025, and in Gurka fluvio in 1249). The Slovene name is derived from Slavic *, based on the Romance name *Corcra or *Corca, derived in turn from Corcora. Many rivers had this name, or similar names, in antiquity. The name is believed to be of pre-Romance origin and may be based on onomatopoeia.

Sources
In heavy downpours, water bursts through the main entrance of Krka Cave and flows in a torrential waterfall over the steps in front of it.

Course
The river passes the town of Žužemberk, Dolenjske Toplice, the town of Novo Mesto, Otočec Castle, and Kostanjevica na Krki, to meet the Sava at Brežice near the Croatian border. Its largest tributary is the Prečna, the continuation of the Temenica River.

References

External links

 Krka (od izvira do sotočja) An Interactive map of the Krka from source to confluence. Burger.si. Accessed 18 April 2012.
 Condition of Krka - graphs, in the following order, of water level and temperature data for the past 30 days (taken in Podbočje by ARSO)

 
Rivers of Lower Carniola
Geography of Novo Mesto
Natura 2000 in Slovenia